The Hymn of Olympiacos or Thrile ton Gipedon (Legend of stadiums) is the anthem of the Greek multi-sport club Olympiacos CFP, based in Piraeus. The lyrics were written in 1980 by the Greek songwriter Kostas Kilimantzos, with Spiros Valsamakis being the composer. Christakis Voliotis was the first to perform the anthem.

Historically, the first hymn of Olympiacos was composed in 1931 by Mimis Vasiliadis (lyrics) and Yiangos Laoutaris (music). It was a march-style anthem and more oriented to football matches.

Anthem

External links
Hymn of Olympiacos (sound)
Hymn of Olympiacos (text) 
Official Club Page
Olympiacos Football Club Official Page
Olympiacos Basketball Club Official Page 
Olympiacos TV

References

Olympiacos
Greek music
Football songs and chants